Jonathan Laugel (born 30 January 1993) is a French rugby seven forward who competed at the 2016 Olympics. He has been playing rugby sevens since 2011 and is contracted to the French Rugby Federation. He made his debut at the 2012 Wellington Sevens.

Laugel competed for France at the 2022 Rugby World Cup Sevens in Cape Town.

Personal life 
Laugel has also participated in Judo and Basketball. He is studying management at the Grenoble School of Management.

References

External links 

 
 
 
 
 FRF Profile 

1993 births
Living people
People from Montmorency, Val-d'Oise
Sportspeople from Val-d'Oise
France international rugby sevens players
Olympic rugby sevens players of France
Rugby sevens players at the 2016 Summer Olympics